James Wallace (13 December 1937 – 2007) was an English footballer who played in the Football League for Doncaster Rovers and Stoke City.

Career
Wallace was born in Birkenhead and joined Stoke City's youth team in the 1950s. He made six appearances for Stoke during the 1958–59 season and made two more in the following season where he scored against Sheffield United in April 1960. Because of an injury in training with new manager Tony Waddington Wallace became surplus to requirements and so was released. He joined Northwich Victoria before enjoying a brief spell back in league football with Doncaster Rovers before returning to non-league with Stafford Rangers. He later went on to manage Leek Town, Nantwich Town, Kidsgrove Athletic and Newcastle Town.

Career statistics

References

English footballers
Stoke City F.C. players
Doncaster Rovers F.C. players
English Football League players
1937 births
2007 deaths
Place of death missing
Date of death missing
Leek Town F.C. managers
Nantwich Town F.C. managers
Kidsgrove Athletic F.C. managers
Newcastle Town F.C. managers
Northwich Victoria F.C. players
Stafford Rangers F.C. players
Association football wingers
English football managers